Soldier Field is a multi-purpose stadium in Chicago which opened in 1924.

Soldier Field, Soldier's Field, or Soldiers Field may also refer to:

 Soldier Field (Washington State University), the 1892–1901 name of Rogers Field
 Joseph J. O'Donnell Field, formerly known as Soldier's Field, Harvard University's home baseball venue in Boston, Massachusetts
 Soldiers Field Soccer Stadium, original name of Jordan Field of Harvard University
 Soldier Field (Dover, Delaware), a baseball stadium on the campus of Delaware State University
 Soldier Field, a 2,000 capacity soccer stadium on the campus of Rogers State University

See also
 Soldiers Field Road, a crosstown parkway in Boston, Massachusetts